John Fitzjames Lynch was an Irish Anglican bishop at the end of the sixteenth century and the beginning of the seventeenth.

Lynch was born in Galway and educated at New Inn Hall, Oxford. He was Rector of Littleton-upon-Severn in 1561; and Canon of Wells in 1564. He was Bishop of Elphin from 1583 until his resignation on 19 August 1611, following his conversion to the Roman Catholic faith.

He had greatly impoverished his see by selling off property, but his successor as bishop, Edward King, restored it to its former prosperity.

References

Anglican bishops of Elphin
Christian clergy from County Galway
Year of birth missing
Year of death missing
16th-century Anglican bishops in Ireland
17th-century Anglican bishops in Ireland
16th-century births
17th-century deaths